Rosier is a surname. Notable people with the surname include:

 Andrée Rosier (born 1978), French chef
 Bertie Rosier (1893–1939), English footballer
 Bruce Rosier (born 1928), Australian Anglican bishop
 Cathy Rosier (1945–2004), Martiniquaise model and actress
 Diego Rosier (born 1994), South African cricketer
 Evan Rosier, fictional character in the Harry Potter universe
 Frederick Rosier (1915–1998), Welsh Royal Air Force commander
 Jacqueline Beaugé-Rosier (born 1932), Haitian–Canadian educator and writer
 James Rosier (1573–1609), English explorer
 Jean-Louis Rosier (1925–2011), French racing driver
 Joan Rosier-Jones (born 1940), New Zealand writer and teacher
 Joseph Rosier (1870–1951), American politician
 Joseph-Bernard Rosier (1804–1880), French playwright and librettist
 Kevin Rosier (1962–2015), American kickboxer, boxer and mixed martial artist
 Louis Rosier (1905–1956), French racing driver
 Malik Rosier (born 1995), American football player
 Michèle Rosier (1930–2017), French fashion journalist and designer
 Pat Rosier (1942–2014), New Zealand writer, editor and feminist activist
 Raymond Rosier (born 1924), Belgian Olympic runner
 Trevor Rosier (born 1943), English cricketer
 Valentin Rosier (born 1996), French footballer

See also
 Roger Rosiers (born 1946), Belgian racing cyclist
 Desrosiers, a surname (including a list of people with the name)
 Roser (name), a surname and a given name (including lists of people with the name)
 Rosier (disambiguation)